Niphosoma is a genus of longhorn beetles of the subfamily Lamiinae, containing the following species:

 Niphosoma compacta Breuning, 1943
 Niphosoma sikkimensis Breuning, 1957

References

Pteropliini